Barbuise is a commune in the Aube department in the Grand Est region of north-central France.

The inhabitants of the commune are known as Barbisiens or Barbisiennes.

Geography
Barbuise is located some 45 km north-west of Troyes and 20 km east of Provins. Access to the commune is by the D40 from La Villeneuve-au-Châtelot in the east which passes through the heart of the commune south of the village and continues west then south-west to join the D40A to Chalautre-la-Grande. The D52 comes from Villenauxe-la-Grande in the north and passes through the village before continuing south-east to Pont-sur-Seine. The D97 goes north-west from the village to Montpothier. The D174 branches off the D97 west of the village and goes north to Plessis-Barbuise. The D197 connects the D40 and the D97 in the west of the commune. The commune is almost all farmland with many lakes occupying a significant area of land in a belt across the commune and in the south-east.

The Canal de Courtavant crosses the south-east of the commune from south-west to north-east. The Noxe river flows from the north passing near the village and joins the canal. The Canal de Soulaunoy joins the Noxe south-west of the village.

History
The area of the commune has been occupied since ancient times as evidenced by many archaeological discoveries and megaliths in the commune.

Barbuise appears as Barbuife on the 1750 Cassini Map and as Barbuise on the 1790 version.

Administration

List of Successive Mayors

Demography
In 2017 the commune had 465 inhabitants.

Sites and monuments

The Dolmen of Grèves de Fraicul (Neolithic) is registered as an historical monument. were a part of Cerny culture.
The parish church dates from the 16th century and contains a large number of items that are registered as historical objects.

See also
Communes of the Aube department

References

Communes of Aube